Hometown Sessions is the second studio album by the American jazz saxophonist Joe Lovano recorded in 1986 and released via JSL Records label.

Track listing
"Stablemates" (Benny Golson) – 5:32
"Now Is the Time" (Sol Parker) – 5:45
"Body and Soul" (Frank Eyton, Johnny Green, Edward Heyman, Robert Sour) – 3:05
"Be-Bop" (Dizzy Gillespie) – 6:02
"You're a Weaver of Dreams" (Victor Young) – 8:00
"T's Bag" (Joe Lovano) – 2:40
"Two Tenors" (Joe Lovano) – 2:48
"St. Thomas" (Sonny Rollins) – 5:13
"Misterioso" (Thelonious Monk) – 5:42

Personnel
Joe Lovano - tenor and soprano saxophone
Anthony Lovano (tracks: 8), Joe Lovano (tracks: 6), Lawrence Jacktown Jackson - drums
Eddie Baccus - organ
Tony "Big T" Lovano (tracks: 2 3 4 6 7) - tenor saxophone

References

External links

Joe Lovano albums
1986 albums